Carlos Damián Casteglione (sometimes spelt Casteglioni; born on 9 May 1980, in Avellaneda, Buenos Aires Province) is an Argentine football defender or defensive midfielder who plays for Juventud Universitario in Torneo Argentino A.

Career
Casteglione started his career in 2002 with Arsenal de Sarandí. He had a short spell in 2004 on loan with Juventud Unida Universitario in the regionalised Argentine third division.

After his loan spell he returned to Arsenal and played for the club during the most successful period in its history. In 2006-07 he helped Arsenal to qualify for the Copa Libertadores for the first time in the club's history.

In 2007, he was the captain of the Arsenal team that won the Copa Sudamericana, but he missed the second leg of the final due to a red card in the first leg in the Azteca stadium. In 2008, Casteglione scored Arsenal's winning goal in the Suruga Bank Championship.

After several years service as the Arsenal club captain, Casteglione joined the Greek club Panionios F.C. in 2009 on a 1-year loan deal. He returned to Argentina in June 2010 to join recently promoted first division team All Boys.

Honours

References

External links
 Argentine Primera statistics at Futbol XXI  
 Carlos Casteglione at Football Lineups
 

1981 births
Living people
Sportspeople from Avellaneda
Argentine footballers
Association football defenders
Argentine Primera División players
Arsenal de Sarandí footballers
Panionios F.C. players
All Boys footballers
Club Atlético Tigre footballers
Rosario Central footballers
Super League Greece players
Argentine expatriate footballers
Expatriate footballers in Greece